Houston County Courier is a newspaper based out of Crockett, Texas. It is a division of East Texas News. It has a circulation of about 10,000. The Houston County Courier is currently a publication of Polk County Publishing Company.

Origins
The Courier began operations in 1890 under the name The Crockett Weekly Courier. The newspaper was established by W. B. Page under publisher Giles M. Haltom.

In 1958, the Courier merged with the Crockett Democrat to form the Courier Democrat. In 1960, the paper became the Houston County Courier''.

References

Houston County, Texas
Weekly newspapers published in Texas